Matthew Allan (born 26 February 1975) is a former Australian rules footballer in the Australian Football League.

He joined with the Carlton Football Club in 1992, and debuted in 1994 as the 1000th player to represent Carlton. He played as a ruckman, reaching his peak in 1999, when he won the John Nicholls Medal, won All-Australian selection and was selected for the International rules series. 

He was traded to the Essendon Football Club following some foot injuries and made his debut with the club in 2004. He had a solid year, playing 20 games and helping Essendon to the finals (along with Justin Murphy, another recycled player). In 2005, he played one game before knee soreness resurfaced (which had kept him out of action for four games in 2004), and following this, at the end of the season Allan confirmed his retirement.

Statistics

|- style="background-color: #EAEAEA"
! scope="row" style="text-align:center" | 1994
|
| 24 || 5 || 1 || 2 || 21 || 7 || 28 || 14 || 0 || 10 || 0.2 || 0.4 || 4.2 || 1.4 || 5.6 || 2.8 || 0.0 || 2.0 || 0
|- 
! scope="row" style="text-align:center" | 1995
|
| 24 || 10 || 6 || 5 || 51 || 28 || 79 || 38 || 7 || 48 || 0.6 || 0.5 || 5.1 || 2.8 || 7.9 || 3.8 || 0.7 || 4.8 || 0
|- style="background-color: #EAEAEA"
! scope="row" style="text-align:center" | 1996
|
| 24 || 19 || 3 || 4 || 84 || 76 || 160 || 55 || 9 || 145 || 0.2 || 0.2 || 4.4 || 4.0 || 8.4 || 2.9 || 0.5 || 7.6 || 0
|- 
! scope="row" style="text-align:center" | 1997
|
| 24 || 21 || 8 || 10 || 178 || 129 || 307 || 113 || 10 || 263 || 0.4 || 0.5 || 8.5 || 6.1 || 14.6 || 5.4 || 0.5 || 12.5 || 3
|- style="background-color: #EAEAEA"
! scope="row" style="text-align:center" | 1998
|
| 24 || 22 || 15 || 7 || 156 || 126 || 282 || 118 || 14 || 471 || 0.7 || 0.3 || 7.1 || 5.7 || 12.8 || 5.4 || 0.6 || 21.4 || 4
|- 
! scope="row" style="text-align:center" | 1999
|
| 24 || 26 || 19 || 14 || 208 || 197 || 405 || 162 || 13 || 716 || 0.7 || 0.5 || 8.0 || 7.6 || 15.6 || 6.2 || 0.5 || 27.5 || 20
|- style="background-color: #EAEAEA"
! scope="row" style="text-align:center" | 2000
|
| 24 || 19 || 17 || 11 || 143 || 128 || 271 || 106 || 10 || 373 || 0.9 || 0.6 || 7.5 || 6.7 || 14.3 || 5.6 || 0.5 || 19.6 || 6
|- 
! scope="row" style="text-align:center" | 2001
|
| 24 || 8 || 3 || 2 || 53 || 41 || 94 || 34 || 4 || 126 || 0.4 || 0.3 || 6.6 || 5.1 || 11.8 || 4.3 || 0.5 || 15.8 || 0
|- style="background-color: #EAEAEA"
! scope="row" style="text-align:center" | 2002
|
| 24 || 4 || 0 || 0 || 22 || 26 || 48 || 19 || 4 || 85 || 0.0 || 0.0 || 5.5 || 6.5 || 12.0 || 4.8 || 1.0 || 21.3 || 0
|- 
! scope="row" style="text-align:center" | 2003
|
| 24 || 6 || 0 || 0 || 29 || 15 || 44 || 16 || 4 || 83 || 0.0 || 0.0 || 4.8 || 2.5 || 7.3 || 2.7 || 0.7 || 13.8 || 0
|- style="background-color: #EAEAEA"
! scope="row" style="text-align:center" | 2004
|
| 27 || 20 || 1 || 1 || 107 || 91 || 198 || 65 || 9 || 309 || 0.1 || 0.1 || 5.4 || 4.6 || 9.9 || 3.3 || 0.5 || 15.5 || 0
|- 
! scope="row" style="text-align:center" | 2005
|
| 27 || 1 || 0 || 0 || 6 || 0 || 6 || 4 || 0 || 17 || 0.0 || 0.0 || 6.0 || 0.0 || 6.0 || 4.0 || 0.0 || 17.0 || 0
|- class="sortbottom"
! colspan=3| Career
! 161
! 73
! 56
! 1058
! 864
! 1922
! 744
! 84
! 2646
! 0.5
! 0.3
! 6.6
! 5.4
! 11.9
! 4.6
! 0.5
! 16.4
! 33
|}

References

External links

Essendon Football Club players
Carlton Football Club players
Victorian State of Origin players
John Nicholls Medal winners
All-Australians (AFL)
1975 births
Living people
Australian rules footballers from Victoria (Australia)
Australia international rules football team players